HAS-250 is UAE  first designed all-weather, long range, anti-ship cruise missile that is made to defend naval and coastal targets. Guided by active radar homing, Global Positioning System and inertial guidance system. HAS-250 is under development by Halcon Systems in Abu Dhabi. Has-250 is expected to enter service with the United Arab Emirates Navy to replace of current inventory of Exocet anti-ship missile.

References 

Anti-ship cruise missiles